William O'Sullivan (1873 – 3 March 1953) was an Irish politician and medical doctor. He was a Cumann na nGaedheal member of Seanad Éireann from 1922 to 1936. He was first elected to the Seanad in 1922 for 9 years and was re-elected in 1931 for 6 years. He served until the Free State Seanad was abolished in 1936.

He was born in County Kerry and qualified as a doctor in 1898. He practised for many years in Killarney where he was Medical officer of health and coroner for Kerry. He died at his home, Inch House, Killarney, on 3 March 1953 aged 79. A noted sportsman himself he was the father of Billy O'Sullivan, an international Irish golfer and golf administrator.

References

1873 births
1953 deaths
Cumann na nGaedheal senators
Fine Gael senators
Members of the 1922 Seanad
Members of the 1925 Seanad
Members of the 1928 Seanad
Members of the 1931 Seanad
Members of the 1934 Seanad